Roa de Duero is a Spanish town and municipality in the southern region of the province of Burgos. This town has a long wine tradition that goes back to the times of the Roman Empire and the wars for the conquest of Iberia.

When the Romans arrived they were impressed by the agrarian wealth that this area bathed by the Douro River had. They settled and founded Roa, formerly called Rauda, where they began to cultivate the grapes. There is no doubt that the Romans were the true pioneers in winemaking using very revolutionary and innovative techniques for the time.

To this day, Roa maintains that innovative spirit of the Roman wines and it is the seat of the Regulatory Council for the Designation of Origin (D.O.) Ribera del Duero wine region.

References

External links 
Roa de Duero
C.I.T. Ruta del Vino - Afluente rural

Municipalities in the Province of Burgos